is a Japanese professional footballer who plays as a defensive midfielder for J1 League club FC Tokyo.

Career statistics

Club
Updated to 19 July 2022.

1Includes Japanese Super Cup, J. League Championship, FIFA Club World Cup.

Honours

Club
Urawa Red Diamonds
AFC Champions League: 2017
J.League Cup: 2016

References

External links

Profile at FC Tokyo

1989 births
Living people
Association football people from Gunma Prefecture
Japanese footballers
J1 League players
Omiya Ardija players
Urawa Red Diamonds players
FC Tokyo players
Association football midfielders